Vercoe is a name. It may refer to:

 Arthur Vercoe Pedlar (1932–2022), British clown
 Barry Vercoe, New Zealand-born computer scientist and composer
 Rik Vercoe, British ultramarathon runner
 Rosemary Vercoe (1917–2013), British costume designer
 Sandra Lee-Vercoe (born 1952), former New Zealand politician and diplomat
 Whakahuihui Vercoe (1928-2007), first Archbishop of New Zealand from the Maori church

See also
 Varcoe
 Verco (disambiguation)